Julie Weiss is a costume designer who has been nominated for two Academy Awards, Seven Emmys and one BAFTA Award. She has won two Emmys for costumes.

She also was nominated for a Tony Award, at the 33rd Tony Awards for The Elephant Man.

In 2011, she received the Career Achievement Award at the Costume Designers Guild Awards.

Oscar nominations
Both are in the category of Best Costumes.

68th Academy Awards-Nominated for 12 Monkeys. Lost to Restoration.
75th Academy Awards-Nominated for Frida. Lost to Chicago.

References

External links

Costume designers
Women costume designers
Living people
Emmy Award winners
Year of birth missing (living people)